Vesa Vasara (born 16 August 1976) is a Finnish professional football manager and a former player who played for the Veikkausliiga sides HJK Helsinki, FF Jaro, and FC Honka, as well as for Kalmar FF in Sweden. He also played 12 caps for the Finland national team, scoring twice.

Vasara was selected as the Veikkausliiga manager of the Month for June 2018 while managing Veikkausliiga side FC Honka.

References

External links
 Vesa Vasara at FC Honka

External links 

1976 births
Living people
Finnish footballers
Association football midfielders
Finland international footballers
Veikkausliiga players
Allsvenskan players
Helsingin Jalkapalloklubi players
FF Jaro players
FC Honka players
Kalmar FF players
Finnish football managers
Veikkausliiga managers
FC Honka managers
Finnish expatriate footballers
Finnish expatriate sportspeople in Sweden
Expatriate footballers in Sweden